The World Group was the highest level of Davis Cup competition in 1999. The first-round losers went into the Davis Cup World Group Qualifying Round, and the winners progressed to the quarterfinals and were guaranteed a World Group spot for 2000.

Sweden were the defending champions, but were eliminated in the first round.

Australia won the title, defeating France in the final, 3–2. The final was held at the Acropolis Exhibition Hall in Nice, France, from 3 to 5 December. It was the Australian team's 27th Davis Cup title overall and their first since 1986.

Participating teams

Draw

First round

Sweden vs. Slovakia

Germany vs. Russia

Great Britain vs. United States

Zimbabwe vs. Australia

France vs. Netherlands

Spain vs. Brazil

Belgium vs. Czech Republic

Switzerland vs. Italy

Quarterfinals

Russia vs. Slovakia

United States vs. Australia

France vs. Brazil

Belgium vs. Switzerland

Semifinals

Australia vs. Russia

France vs. Belgium

Final

France vs. Australia

References

External links
Davis Cup official website

World Group
Davis Cup World Group
Davis Cup